Thomas Benade (born 1 September 1982) is a Zimbabwean cricketer. He played six first-class matches between 2001 and 2004.

See also
 CFX Academy cricket team

References

External links
 

1982 births
Living people
Zimbabwean cricketers
CFX Academy cricketers
Mashonaland cricketers
Mid West Rhinos cricketers
Sportspeople from Harare